Daeg Neergaard Faerch (born September 27, 1995), also known as GreatDaeg, is an American actor, singer, songwriter, and rapper. He is perhaps best known for his portrayal of young Michael Myers in Rob Zombie's horror remake Halloween (2007). Faerch has also played in theatrical productions of Grapes of Wrath in which he played the role of Winfield, Marat/Sade in which he played the role of young Herald, Waiting for Godot playing the messenger, and Shakespeare Unabridged as a musical guest. He has performed in multiple Shakespeare productions, including Coriolanus, in which he played young Coriolanus, The Merry Wives of Windsor, and Hamlet. He also landed the role of Pincegurre in the French play L'Impromptu de Théophile, as well as a role in the comedy The Nerd, in which he played the character Thor Waldgrave. In addition to English, Faerch speaks French. On YouTube Faerch has posted videos in which he performs in rap music videos. His albums include Stunt from the 6 (2018), Vlad (2019), Albino Animal (2019), Quarantime (2020), Wicked Wicked West (2020), and Pieces (2020).

Career

Halloween
As a child actor, Faerch was cast in the Halloween remake as a young Michael Myers, performing his own stunts.  Faerch's performance as the murderous young Myers was met with positive reviews. KPBS said of the young actor: "Daeg Faerch is key in making these early scenes work. He delivers a truly chilling performance as a surprisingly sweet, soft and feminine looking ten-year-old Myers. His physical appearance contrasts with his brutal actions and it's only in his eyes that you perceive his true nature...Faerch’s Myers can be like a normal kid one minute and a monster the next."  Although Faerch was initially signed on to reprise his role as young Michael Myers in the sequel, Halloween II (then known as H2), after filming briefly in Georgia as young Michael, he was later recast because he had grown taller. He was replaced by Chase Wright Vanek.

Other projects
Faerch has a comedic role as a character named Michel in Peter Berg's 2008 Will Smith film, Hancock, where he plays a French American neighborhood boy who swears at Smith and is thrown into the sky by the titular superhero for insulting him, but falls back to earth unharmed with Hancock catching him.

Faerch's other projects include the thriller Sebastian in the title role, which also features his mother; the Christmas comedy Wreck the Halls starring Mickey Rooney as Santa Claus; the short film "Suffer the Little Children", based on a story by Stephen King co-starring his mother. Faerch also performed in 2008 episodes of the TV show Pushing Daisies, as a German schoolboy. He also recently co-starred as a homosexual young man named Jesse in the award-winning short film, Mental. On April 14, 2012, Faerch's 2010/2011 film Sebastian premiered at the Independent Film Quarterly (IFQ) Film and Webisode Festival, its only screening, where it also won Best Sci-Fi Feature.

A serious, near-fatal head injury and emergency surgery put Faerch's career on hold in 2012. In April 2013, Faerch and Kimberly J. Brown were attached to star in a science fiction thriller entitled Out There..., to be directed by writer and Colorado native Bonné Bartron. It was to be filmed in Bartron's home state, and was originally to be funded through Kickstarter, but failed to meet its $200,000 goal. Bartron then posted an update on Kickstarter, stating that she was taking the project to Indiegogo with flexible funding. According to Bartron, the campaign would be launched "in the coming days."

In August 2014, Faerch's mother announced on Facebook that he would be taking a break from rapping to film a role "in the coming month". The project was later revealed to be Ditch Party by the film's official Facebook page. The film was met with negative consensus. Filmthreat.com describes his role as "he's an invisible presence for most of the first two acts, much-discussed but rarely encountered. That turns out to be for the better, because when he does finally cross paths with the holed-up main characters, he has a tendency toward monologues that wouldn't pass muster for a third-rate Walking Dead villain."

In 2015, Faerch's planned films were to include the Christian football/drug TV movie Lost in Oxyland as Dylan Jennings, the Daniel Baldwin Christian boxing drama Devotion as "Paul the Bartender", the drug thriller The Glass Circle as "The Weasel", a role in the Edward Furlong action-thriller Karma, a role in the thriller Amnesia, and the role of Devontae in the race-drama Peterson Park. As of July 2021, none of these films have been made.

In June 2015, writer-director Edward Burney Jr. launched an unsuccessful Kickstarter campaign for Peterson Park, along with an official website.

In 2016, Faerch had a minor voice role in Ben Affleck's The Accountant.

Faerch is featured in Blondie's music video for "Fun" from their 2017 album Pollinator.

In 2018, Faerch co-starred with Sophie Turner in the independent film, Josie.

Acclaim
Faerch was named best minor character in Miami Herald's 2008 Movie Yearbook for his role in Hancock.

HorrorNews.net ranks Fearch in the all-time Top Ten Kids in Horror. Similarly, Fear Fragments.com ranks his Young Michael Myers as the No. 2 greatest "evil kid" performance in horror. 411Mania.com ranks Michael Myers as portrayed by Faerch and Tyler Mane as #5 on its list of the Top 8 Asylum Inmates.

Filmography

References

External links
 

1995 births
Living people
American male child actors
American male film actors
American male television actors
American people of Danish descent
Male actors from San Diego
21st-century American male actors